Virginia Gibson (born Virginia Gorski; April 9, 1925 – April 25, 2013) was an American dancer, singer and actress of film, television and musical theatre.

Early years 
Of Polish and Irish lineage, Gibson was the daughter of Mr. and Mrs. John S. Gorski. She graduated from St. Alphonsus Parochial School.

Career
Gibson, who was signed by Warner Bros. in 1950 and made her film debut in Tea for Two (1950), started her career in musicals in her hometown of St. Louis, Missouri. In 1937, she was one of 35 girls chosen for ballet in St. Louis Opera Company productions. She danced in the chorus of a production of The Student Prince there in 1940, and in 1943 she was part of the dancing chorus of the summer season of the Muny Opera. In the fall of 1943, she was one of three dancers from that group to sign contracts to perform in Roll Up Your Sleeves on Broadway. She used her birth name on Broadway through 1949. In 1947, she returned to perform at Muny Opera, this time as the star of No, No, Nanette.

Billed as a starlet, she was part of the group of Hollywood actors who traveled across the country in 1951-1952 promoting the 50th Anniversary of movie theaters. With Roscoe Ates and Charles Starrett she toured eastern Oklahoma greeting the public. In Hollywood she played supporting or leading roles in a number of Warner Brothers musicals. Her most famous film role was Liza in Seven Brides for Seven Brothers (1954). Reflecting on Warners' non-renewal of her option, Gibson said, "There are just so many musicals, and they had Doris Day. And who can shine in comparison to her vivacity?"

On television, Gibson was a regular on Captain Billy's Showboat (1948). She also starred in So This Is Hollywood (1955). She was a regular performer on The Johnny Carson Show (1955–56), an earlier Carson series, not to be confused with The Tonight Show Starring Johnny Carson. In 1956 she returned to Broadway to play Ethel Merman's daughter in the musical Happy Hunting. She then became one of the stars of Your Hit Parade, one of the most popular TV shows of the 1950s, for one season. She had a three-month stint as a jazz singer on the TV version of Young Doctor Malone. From 1962 to 1971 she co-hosted, with Frank Buxton (and later, Bill Owen), the ABC-TV children's documentary program Discovery.

Gibson also appeared in commercials for a cake mixes, cameras, candy bars, detergents and various soap products, hair sprays, and paper towels.

When her performing career ended, she taught at the HB Studio in New York.

Death
On April 25, 2013, Gibson died in Newtown, Pennsylvania, at the age of 88.

Awards
In 1957 she was nominated for a Tony Award Best Featured Actress in a Musical, for her portrayal of Beth Livingstone in Happy Hunting.

Personal life
Gibson never married or had any children. She adhered to Roman Catholicism and she was a lifelong Republican who supported Dwight Eisenhower during the 1952 presidential election.

Theatrical Appearances
 A Connecticut Yankee (Dancing Girl), 1943–44, Martin Beck Theater, New York
 Laffing Room Only (Dancer). 1944-45, Winter Garden Theater, New York
 Billion Dollar Baby (Chorine, Dancer), 1945–46, Alvin Theater, New York
 No, No, Nanette (Nanette), 1947, St. Louis Municipal Opera
 Babes in Toyland (Jill), 1947, St. Louis Municipal Opera
 High Button Shoes (corps de ballet), 1947, New Century Theatre, New York
 Look, Ma, I'm Dancin'! (Snow White), 1948, Adelphi Theatre, New York
 Along Fifth Avenue (Singer, dancer), 1949, Broadhurst Theatre, New York
 Bitter Sweet (Dolly), 1949, St. Louis Municipal Opera
 Bloomer Girl (Daisy), 1949, St. Louis Municipal Opera
 Irene (Helen), 1949, St. Louis Municipal Opera 
 The Vagabond King (Lady Mary), 1949, St. Louis Municipal Opera
 The New Moon (Julie), 1949, St. Louis Municipal Opera
 Whoopee! (Harriet Underwood), 1950, St. Louis Municipal Opera
 The Great Waltz (lead dancer) 1953, Los Angeles Civic Light Opera and San Francisco Light Opera
 Happy Hunting (Beth Livingstone), 1956–57, Majestic Theatre, New York

Filmography
Tea for Two Warner Brothers, 1950
Painting the Clouds With Sunshine Warner Brothers, 1951
Goodbye, My Fancy Warner Brothers, 1951
The Miracle of Our Lady of Fatima Warner Brothers, 1952 (Virgin Mary, uncredited) 
About Face Warner Brothers, 1952
Stop, You're Killing Me Warner Brothers, 1952
She's Back on Broadway Warner Brothers, 1953
Seven Brides for Seven Brothers MGM, 1954
Athena MGM, 1954
So This Is Hollywood (TV sitcom) 1955
I Killed Wild Bill Hickok The Wheeler Company, 1956
Once Upon a Honeymoon Jerry Fairbanks Productions, 1956
Funny Face Paramount Pictures, 1957

References

External links

 
 
 

1925 births
2013 deaths
Actresses from St. Louis
American television actresses
American film actresses
American musical theatre actresses
American female dancers
20th-century American actresses
American Roman Catholics
New York (state) Republicans
Pennsylvania Republicans
California Republicans
Missouri Republicans
21st-century American women